Ischnopteris is a genus of moths in the family Geometridae described by Jacob Hübner in 1823.

Species
Ischnopteris obsoleta Rindge, 1983
Ischnopteris pallidicosta Schaus
Ischnopteris variegata Schaus
Ischnopteris albiguttata Warren, 1904
Ischnopteris aurudaria Schaus, 1901
Ischnopteris beckeri Pitkin, 2005
Ischnopteris bifinita Walker, 1862
Ischnopteris bifurcata Pitkin, 2005
Ischnopteris bipectinata Pitkin, 2005
Ischnopteris brehmi Pitkin, 2005
Ischnopteris bryifera Felder & Rogenhofer, 1875
Ischnopteris catocalata Guenée, [1858]
Ischnopteris chavesi Pitkin, 2005
Ischnopteris chlorata Hübner, [1823]
Ischnopteris chloroclystata Guenée, [1858]
Ischnopteris chlorophaearia Walker, 1866
Ischnopteris fabiana Stoll, 1782
Ischnopteris fasciata Pitkin, 2005
Ischnopteris fassli Pitkin, 2005
Ischnopteris hirsuta Pitkin, 2005
Ischnopteris hoffmani Pitkin, 2005
Ischnopteris illineata Warren, 1909
Ischnopteris inornata Pitkin, 2005
Ischnopteris janzeni Pitkin, 2005
Ischnopteris klagesi Pitkin, 2005
Ischnopteris lata Pitkin, 2005
Ischnopteris latijuxta Pitkin, 2005
Ischnopteris lemoulti Pitkin, 2005
Ischnopteris miseliata Guenée, [1858]
Ischnopteris multistrigata Warren, 1909
Ischnopteris obtortionis Prout, 1928
Ischnopteris ochroprosthia Prout, 1929
Ischnopteris palmeri Pitkin, 2005
Ischnopteris pronubata Felder & Rogenhofer, 1875
Ischnopteris rostellaria Felder & Rogenhofer, 1875
Ischnopteris seriei Giacomelli, 1911
Ischnopteris stenoptila Warren, 1907
Ischnopteris watsoni Pitkin, 2005
Ischnopteris xylinata Guenée, [1858]

References

Geometridae